Tshikapa Airport  is an airport serving Tshikapa in Kasaï Province, Democratic Republic of the Congo.

Airlines and destinations

Accidents and incidents
In 1988, Vickers Viscount 9Q-CTS of Filair was damaged beyond economic repair in a landing accident.

See also

 List of airports in the Democratic Republic of the Congo

References

 Tshikapa
 SkyVector Aeronautical Charts - Tshikapa

External links
 
 HERE Maps - Tshikapa
 OurAirports - Tshikapa

Airports in Kasaï Province
Tshikapa